Crown Commissioner was a proposed new title to replace the title of Lieutenant Governor of the Isle of Man.

The proposed change was then submitted to the Lord of Mann Elizabeth II for the Royal Assent.

In April 2006, however, after much public disapproval, Tynwald rejected the previously approved proposal and withdrew their request for Royal Assent. Accordingly, the lieutenant governor will remain as currently titled.

References

See also
Lieutenant Governor of the Isle of Man.

Government of the Isle of Man
History of the Isle of Man